The 1997 New York Yankees season was the 95th season for the Yankees. New York was managed by Joe Torre and played at Yankee Stadium. The team finished with a record of 96–66 finishing 2 games behind the Baltimore Orioles in the American League East. They entered the postseason as the American League Wild Card, but lost the Division Series in 5 games to the Cleveland Indians. The 1997 Yankees failed to repeat as World Series Champions and win their second consecutive title.

Offseason
October 2, 1996: Pat Listach was sent by the New York Yankees to the Milwaukee Brewers to complete an earlier deal made on August 23, 1996. The New York Yankees sent Bob Wickman and Gerald Williams to the Milwaukee Brewers for a player to be named later, Pat Listach, and Graeme Lloyd. The Milwaukee Brewers sent Ricky Bones (August 29, 1996) to the New York Yankees to complete the trade. Pat Listach returned to original teams on October 2, 1996.
November 4, 1996: Clay Bellinger was signed as a free agent with the New York Yankees.
December 5, 1996: Jim Leyritz was traded by the New York Yankees to the Anaheim Angels for players to be named later. The Anaheim Angels sent Jeremy Blevins (minors) (December 9, 1996) and Ryan Kane (minors) (December 9, 1996) to the New York Yankees to complete the trade.
December 11, 1996: Mike Stanton was signed as a free agent with the New York Yankees.
January 9, 1997: Mark Whiten was signed as a free agent with the New York Yankees.
January 9, 1997: Luis Sojo was signed as a free agent with the New York Yankees.

Notable transaction chart
 June 9, 1997: Dave Weathers was traded by the New York Yankees to the Cleveland Indians for Chad Curtis.
 July 29, 1997: Mariano Duncan was traded by the New York Yankees with cash to the Toronto Blue Jays for Angel Ramirez (minors).
 August 15, 1997: Mark Whiten was released by the New York Yankees.

Season standings

Season summary

June
On June 16: The first interleague game between the New York Mets and New York Yankees took place at Yankee Stadium. The Mets won the game by a score of 6–0.

August 
On August 31: The New York Yankees retired Don Mattingly's number.

Record vs. opponents

Detailed record

Roster

Game log

|- align="center" bgcolor="ffbbbb"
| 1 || April 1 || @ Mariners || 2–4 || Fassero (1–0) || Cone (0–1) || Charlton (1) || Kingdome || 57,586 || 0–1
|- align="center" bgcolor="bbffbb"
| 2 || April 2 || @ Mariners || 16–2 || Pettitte (1–0) || Sanders (0–1) || || Kingdome || 30,951 || 1–1
|- align="center" bgcolor="ffbbbb"
| 3 || April 4 || @ Athletics || 2–4 || Acre (1–0) || Weathers (0–1) || Taylor (2) || Oakland Alameda Coliseum || 17,330 || 1–2
|- align="center" bgcolor="bbffbb"
| 4 || April 5 || @ Athletics || 10–5 || Gooden (1–0) || Mohler (0–1) || Rivera (1) || Oakland Alameda Coliseum || 25,438 || 2–2 
|- align="center" bgcolor="ffbbbb"
| 5 || April 6 || @ Athletics || 0–3 || Acre (2–0) || Nelson (0–1) || Taylor (3) || Oakland Alameda Coliseum || 22,124 || 2–3
|- align="center" bgcolor="bbffbb"
| 6 || April 7 || @ Angels || 5–3 || Pettitte (2–0) || Langston (0–1) || Rivera (2) || Anaheim Stadium || 16,514 || 3–3
|- align="center" bgcolor="ffbbbb"
| 7 || April 8 || @ Angels || 9–10 (12) || James (1–0) || Nelson (0–2) || || Anaheim Stadium || 17,202 || 3–4
|- align="center" bgcolor="bbffbb"
| 8 || April 9 || @ Angels || 12–5 || Wells (1–0) || Watson (0–1) || || Anaheim Stadium || 19,242 || 4–4
|- align="center" bgcolor="ffbbbb"
| 9 || April 11 || Athletics || 1–3 || Small (2–0) || Nelson (0–3) || || Yankee Stadium || 56,710 || 4–5
|- align="center" bgcolor="bbffbb"
| 10 || April 13 || Athletics || 3–2 || Pettitte (3–0) || Telgheder (0–1) || Rivera (3) || Yankee Stadium || || 5–5
|- align="center" bgcolor="ffbbbb"
| 11 || April 13 || Athletics || 4–7 || Prieto (1–0) || Mendoza (0–1) || Taylor (5) || Yankee Stadium || 32,098 || 5–6
|- align="center" bgcolor="ffbbbb"
| 12 || April 14 || Angels || 1–5 || Dickson (2–0) || Rogers (0–1) || || Yankee Stadium || 15,082 || 5–7
|- align="center" bgcolor="ffbbbb"
| 13 || April 15 || Angels || 5–6 || Hasegawa (1–1) || Rivera (0–1) || James (1) || Yankee Stadium || 16,944 || 5–8
|- align="center" bgcolor="ffbbbb"
| 14 || April 16 || @ Brewers || 4–7 || Mercedes (1–0) || Cone (0–2) || Jones (4) || Milwaukee County Stadium || 7,263 || 5–9
|- align="center" bgcolor="ffbbbb"
| 15 || April 17 || @ Brewers || 4–5 || Wickman (2–0) || Lloyd (0–1) || || Milwaukee County Stadium || 8,018 || 5–10
|- align="center" bgcolor="bbffbb"
| 16 || April 18 || @ White Sox || 10–4 || Mendoza (1–1) || Navarro (1–1) || || Comiskey Park II || 18,603 || 6–10 
|- align="center" bgcolor="bbffbb"
| 17 || April 19 || @ White Sox || 3–2 || Rogers (1–1) || Castillo (1–2) || Rivera (4) || Comiskey Park II || 24,976 || 7–10
|- align="center" bgcolor="ffbbbb"
| 18 || April 20 || @ White Sox || 7–8 || Levine (1–1) || Boehringer (0–1) || || Comiskey Park II || 23,601 || 7–11
|- align="center" bgcolor="bbffbb"
| 19 || April 21 || @ White Sox || 4–3 || Cone (1–2) || Drabek (1–2) || Rivera (5) || Comiskey Park II || 16,694 || 8–11
|- align="center" bgcolor="bbffbb"
| 20 || April 22 || Brewers || 10–2 || Pettitte (4–0) || D'Amico (0–1) || || Yankee Stadium || 18,018 || 9–11
|- align="center" bgcolor="bbffbb"
| 21 || April 23 || Brewers || 10–5 || Rogers (2–1) || McDonald (2–2) || Lloyd (1) || Yankee Stadium || 22,704 || 10–11
|- align="center" bgcolor="ffbbbb"
| 22 || April 25 || White Sox || 3–9 || Álvarez (1–3) || Wells (1–1) || || Yankee Stadium || 24,648 || 10–12
|- align="center" bgcolor="bbffbb"
| 23 || April 26 || White Sox || 10–2 || Cone (2–2) || Baldwin (0–3) || Rivera (6) || Yankee Stadium || 28,817 || 11–12
|- align="center" bgcolor="bbffbb"
| 24 || April 27 || White Sox || 7–1 || Pettitte (5–0) || Drabek (1–3) || || Yankee Stadium || 36,133 || 12–12
|- align="center" bgcolor="bbffbb"
| 25 || April 28 || Mariners || 6–5 || Nelson (1–3) || Ayala (2–1) || Rivera (7) || Yankee Stadium || 20,054 || 13–12
|- align="center" bgcolor="ffbbbb"
| 26 || April 29 || Mariners || 5–7 || McCarthy (1–0) || Mecir (0–1) || || Yankee Stadium || 21,955 || 13–13 
|- align="center" bgcolor="bbffbb"
| 27 || April 30 || Mariners || 3–2 || Wells (2–1) || Martínez (1–2) || Rivera (8) || Yankee Stadium || 25,708 || 14–13 
|-

|- align="center" bgcolor="bbffbb"
| 28 || May 2 || @ Royals || 9–1 || Cone (3–2) || Pittsley (0–2) || Rivera (9) || Kauffman Stadium || 24,258 || 15–13
|- align="center" bgcolor="ffbbbb"
| 29 || May 3 || @ Royals || 1–2 || Belcher (3–3) || Pettitte (5–1) || || Kauffman Stadium || 25,585 || 15–14
|- align="center" bgcolor="bbffbb"
| 30 || May 4 || @ Royals || 13–5 || Boehringer (1–1) || Rusch (2–2) || || Kauffman Stadium || 30,034 || 16–14
|- align="center" bgcolor="ffbbbb"
| 31 || May 5 || Twins || 8–9 || Swindell (2–1) || Mecir (0–2) || || Yankee Stadium || 16,599 || 16–15
|- align="center" bgcolor="bbffbb"
| 32 || May 6 || Twins || 7–2 || Wells (3–1) || Aldred (1–4) || || Yankee Stadium || 13,939 || 17–15
|- align="center" bgcolor="bbffbb"
| 33 || May 7 || Rangers || 5–2 || Cone (4–2) || Burkett (1–2) || Rivera (10) || Yankee Stadium || 18,778 || 18–15
|- align="center" bgcolor="bbffbb"
| 34 || May 8 || Rangers || 5–4 || Pettitte (6–1) || Oliver (1–3) || Rivera (11) || Yankee Stadium || 17,483 || 19–15
|- align="center" bgcolor="ffbbbb"
| 35 || May 9 || Royals || 5–7 || Veres (2–0) || Boehringer (1–2) || || Yankee Stadium || 20,098 || 19–16
|- align="center" bgcolor="bbffbb"
| 36 || May 10 || Royals || 5–2 || Mendoza (2–1) || Appier (4–2) || Rivera (12) || Yankee Stadium || 25,007 || 20–16
|- align="center" bgcolor="bbffbb"
| 37 || May 11 || Royals || 3–2 || Wells (4–2) || Rosado (3–1) || Rivera (13) || Yankee Stadium || 25,705 || 21–16
|- align="center" bgcolor="bbffbb"
| 38 || May 13 || @ Twins || 11–2 || Cone (5–2) || Robertson (3–2) || || Hubert H. Humphrey Metrodome || 15,082 || 22–16
|- align="center" bgcolor="bbffbb"
| 39 || May 14 || @ Twins || 6–5 || Boehringer (2–2) || Guardado (0–1) || Rivera (14) || Hubert H. Humphrey Metrodome || 17,660 || 23–16
|- align="center" bgcolor="bbffbb"
| 40 || May 15 || @ Rangers || 8–2 || Rogers (3–1) || Alberro (0–1) || || The Ballpark in Arlington || 35,488 || 24–16
|- align="center" bgcolor="ffbbbb"
| 41 || May 16 || @ Rangers || 0–6 || Santana (2–0) || Wells (4–2) || Patterson (1) || The Ballpark in Arlington || 42,420 || 24–17
|- align="center" bgcolor="bbffbb"
| 42 || May 17 || @ Rangers || 11–5 || Mendoza (3–1) || Burkett (2–3) || || The Ballpark in Arlington || 46,625 || 25–17
|- align="center" bgcolor="ffbbbb"
| 43 || May 18 || @ Rangers || 2–4 || Oliver (2–4) || Cone (5–3) || Wetteland (10) || The Ballpark in Arlington || 46,850 || 25–18
|- align="center" bgcolor="ffbbbb"
| 44 || May 20 || Blue Jays || 0–2 || Hentgen (5–1) || Pettitte (6–2) || || Yankee Stadium || 20,220 || 25–19
|- align="center" bgcolor="ffbbbb"
| 45 || May 21 || Blue Jays || 1–4 || Clemens (8–0) || Rogers (3–2) || || Yankee Stadium || 19,863 || 25–20
|- align="center" bgcolor="ffbbbb"
| 46 || May 22 || Red Sox || 2–8 || Gordon (3–5) || Wells (4–3) || || Yankee Stadium || 28,255 || 25–21
|- align="center" bgcolor="ffbbbb"
| 47 || May 23 || Red Sox || 3–9 || Sele (5–3) || Nelson (1–4) || || Yankee Stadium || 29,003 || 25–22
|- align="center" bgcolor="bbffbb"
| 48 || May 24 || Red Sox || 4–2 || Rivera (1–1) || Wasdin (0–2) || || Yankee Stadium || 44,094 || 26–22
|- align="center" bgcolor="ffbbbb"
| 49 || May 26 || Orioles || 6–8 || Boskie (2–2) || Pettitte (6–3) || Myers (16) || Yankee Stadium || 40,296 || 26–23
|- align="center" bgcolor="ffbbbb"
| 50 || May 27 || Orioles || 6–10 || Kamieniecki (4–2) || Rogers (3–3) || Benítez (6) || Yankee Stadium || 29,392 || 26–24
|- align="center" bgcolor="bbffbb"
| 51 || May 28 || @ Blue Jays || 6–4 || Wells (5–3) || Guzman (3–5) || Rivera (15) || SkyDome || 32,338 || 27–24
|- align="center" bgcolor="bbffbb"
| 52 || May 29 || @ Blue Jays || 4–0 || Cone (6–3) || Williams (1–5) || Nelson (1) || SkyDome || 43,155 || 28–24
|- align="center" bgcolor="ffbbbb"
| 53 || May 30 || @ Red Sox || 4–10 || Hammond (3–3) || Mendoza (3–2) || || Fenway Park || 32,341 || 28–25
|- align="center" bgcolor="bbffbb"
| 54 || May 31 || @ Red Sox || 7–2 || Pettitte (7–3) || Wakefield (1–4) || || Fenway Park || 32,736 || 29–25
|-

|- align="center" bgcolor="bbffbb"
| 55 || June 1 || @ Red Sox || 11–6 || Nelson (2–4) || Lacy (0–1) || || Fenway Park || 31,798 || 30–25
|- align="center" bgcolor="bbffbb"
| 56 || June 2 || @ Red Sox || 5–2 || Wells (6–3) || Sele (6–4) || Rivera (16) || Fenway Park || 31,329 || 31–25
|- align="center" bgcolor="ffbbbb"
| 57 || June 3 || @ Orioles || 5–7 || Myers (1–2) || Mecir (0–3) || || Oriole Park at Camden Yards || 47,577 || 31–26
|- align="center" bgcolor="ffbbbb"
| 58 || June 4 || @ Orioles || 7–9 || Orosco (2–0) || Nelson (2–5) || Myers (18) || Oriole Park at Camden Yards || 47,748 || 31–27
|- align="center" bgcolor="bbffbb"
| 59 || June 6 || Brewers || 6–3 || Rogers (4–3) || Mercedes (2–2) || Rivera (17) || Yankee Stadium || 24,578 || 32–27
|- align="center" bgcolor="bbffbb"
| 60 || June 7 || Brewers || 2–0 || Wells (7–3) || Karl (2–7) || Rivera (18) || Yankee Stadium || 28,074 || 33–27
|- align="center" bgcolor="bbffbb"
| 61 || June 8 || Brewers || 3–1 || Cone (7–3) || D'Amico (2–3) || Rivera (19) || Yankee Stadium || 41,268 || 34–27
|- align="center" bgcolor="bbffbb"
| 62 || June 10 || White Sox || 12–1 || Pettitte (8–3) || Navarro (4–5) || || Yankee Stadium || 28,079 || 35–27
|- align="center" bgcolor="bbffbb"
| 63 || June 11 || White Sox || 7–5 || Stanton (1–0) || McElroy (0–1) || Rivera (20) || Yankee Stadium || 22,190 || 36–27
|- align="center" bgcolor="ffbbbb"
| 64 || June 13 || @ Marlins || 1–2 || Cook (1–0) || Mecir (0–4) || || Pro Player Stadium || 42,455 || 36–28
|- align="center" bgcolor="bbffbb"
| 65 || June 15 || @ Marlins || 8–5 || Stanton (2–0) || Cook (1–1) || Rivera (21) || Pro Player Stadium || 42,845 || 37–28 
|- align="center" bgcolor="ffbbbb"
| 66 || June 15 || @ Marlins || 5–6 || Nen (5–2) || Rivera (1–2) || || Pro Player Stadium || 42,153 || 37–29
|- align="center" bgcolor="ffbbbb"
| 67 || June 16 || Mets || 0–6 || Mlicki (3–5) || Pettitte (8–4) || || Yankee Stadium || 56,188 || 37–30
|- align="center" bgcolor="bbffbb"
| 68 || June 17 || Mets || 6–3 || Wells (8–3) || Reynoso (5–1) || Rivera (22) || Yankee Stadium || 56,253 || 38–30
|- align="center" bgcolor="bbffbb"
| 69 || June 18 || Mets || 3–2 || Stanton (3–0) || McMichael (3–6) || || Yankee Stadium || 56,278 || 39–30
|- align="center" bgcolor="bbffbb"
| 70 || June 20 || @ Indians || 7–1 || Gooden (2–0) || Nagy (8–4) || || Jacobs Field || 43,019 || 40–30
|- align="center" bgcolor="ffbbbb"
| 71 || June 21 || @ Indians || 4–13 || Hershiser (7–3) || Pettitte (8–5) || || Jacobs Field || 43,006 || 40–31
|- align="center" bgcolor="ffbbbb"
| 72 || June 22 || @ Indians || 2–5 || Anderson (2–1) || Wells (8–4) || Jackson (8) || Jacobs Field || 42,912 || 40–32
|- align="center" bgcolor="bbffbb"
| 73 || June 23 || @ Tigers || 5–2 || Cone (8–3) || Lira (4–4) || Rivera (23) || Tiger Stadium || 14,556 || 41–32
|- align="center" bgcolor="bbffbb"
| 74 || June 24 || @ Tigers || 12–9 || Lloyd (1–1) || Myers (0–4) || Rivera (24) || Tiger Stadium || 15,872 || 42–32
|- align="center" bgcolor="bbffbb"
| 75 || June 25 || @ Tigers || 3–1 || Stanton (4–0) || Thompson (7–6) || Rivera (25) || Tiger Stadium || 15,348 || 43–32
|- align="center" bgcolor="bbffbb"
| 76 || June 27 || Indians || 3–2 || Gooden (3–0) || Hershiser (7–4) || Rivera (26) || Yankee Stadium || 35,837 || 44–32
|- align="center" bgcolor="ffbbbb"
| 77 || June 28 || Indians || 8–12 || Plunk (2–2) || Rogers (4–4) || || Yankee Stadium || 41,085 || 44–33
|- align="center" bgcolor="bbffbb"
| 78 || June 29 || Indians || 11–10 || Rivera (2–2) || Mesa (0–4) || || Yankee Stadium || 39,756 || 45–33
|- align="center" bgcolor="bbffbb"
| 79 || June 30 || Braves || 1–0 || Stanton (5–0) || Bielecki (3–4) || || Yankee Stadium || 39,887 || 46–33
|-

|- align="center" bgcolor="ffbbbb"
| 80 || July 1 || Braves || 1–3 || Neagle (12–1) || Mendoza (3–3) || Wohlers (18) || Yankee Stadium || 39,596 || 46–34
|- align="center" bgcolor="ffbbbb"
| 81 || July 2 || Braves || 0–2 || Maddux (11–3) || Gooden (3–1) || || Yankee Stadium || 36,606 || 46–35
|- align="center" bgcolor="bbffbb"
| 82 || July 3 || @ Blue Jays || 3–1 || Wells (9–4) || Williams (3–8) || Rivera (27) || SkyDome || 31,227 || 47–35
|- align="center" bgcolor="ffbbbb"
| 83 || July 4 || @ Blue Jays || 0–1 || Escobar (2–0) || Cone (8–4) || || SkyDome || 34,134 || 47–36
|- align="center" bgcolor="bbffbb"
| 84 || July 5 || @ Blue Jays || 8–0 || Pettitte (9–4) || Hentgen (8–6) || || SkyDome || 44,206 || 48–36
|- align="center" bgcolor="ffbbbb"
| 85 || July 6 || @ Blue Jays || 0–2 || Clemens (13–3) || Mendoza (3–4) || || SkyDome || 41,137 || 48–37
|- align="center" bgcolor="bbffbb"
| 86 || July 10 || Tigers || 10–3 || Irabu (1–0) || Olivares (5–6) || || Yankee Stadium || 51,901 || 49–37
|- align="center" bgcolor="bbffbb"
| 87 || July 11 || Tigers || 3–0 || Pettitte (10–5) || Moehler (6–7) || Rivera (28) || Yankee Stadium || 27,135 || 50–37
|- align="center" bgcolor="bbffbb"
| 88 || July 12 || Tigers || 6–2 || Cone (9–4) || Lira (5–6) || Rivera (29) || Yankee Stadium || 39,681 || 51–37
|- align="center" bgcolor="ffbbbb"
| 89 || July 13 || Tigers || 1–3 || Blair (7–4) || Gooden (3–2) || Jones (14) || Yankee Stadium || 36,679 || 51–38
|- align="center" bgcolor="ffbbbb"
| 90 || July 14 || Indians || 2–3 || Jackson (2–1) || Rivera (2–3) || || Yankee Stadium || 27,812 || 51–39
|- align="center" bgcolor="bbffbb"
| 91 || July 15 || Indians || 12–6 || Irabu (2–0) || Nagy (9–6) || Mendoza (1) || Yankee Stadium || 34,503 || 52–39
|- align="center" bgcolor="bbffbb"
| 92 || July 16 || @ White Sox || 11–5 || Pettitte (11–5) || Álvarez (8–7) || || Comiskey Park II || 26,144 || 53–39
|- align="center" bgcolor="bbffbb"
| 93 || July 17 || @ White Sox || 4–2 || Cone (10–4) || Darwin (4–7) || Rivera (30) || Comiskey Park II || 31,923 || 54–39
|- align="center" bgcolor="ffbbbb" 
| 94 || July 18 || @ Brewers || 4–6 || D'Amico (8–4) || Gooden (3–3) || Fetters (1) || Milwaukee County Stadium || 24,071 || 54–40
|- align="center" bgcolor="bbffbb"
| 95 || July 19 || @ Brewers || 8–0 || Wells (10–4) || Mercedes (3–5) || || Milwaukee County Stadium || 38,156 || 55–40
|- align="center" bgcolor="ffbbbb"
| 96 || July 20 || @ Brewers || 2–6 || Karl (4–10) || Irabu (2–1) || || Milwaukee County Stadium || 29,333 || 55–41 
|- align="center" bgcolor="bbffbb"
| 97 || July 21 || @ Brewers || 7–3 || Pettitte (12–5) || Florie (1–2) || Stanton (1) || Milwaukee County Stadium || 20,074 || 56–41
|- align="center" bgcolor="bbffbb"
| 98 || July 22 || Angels || 9–2 || Cone (11–4) || Springer (5–4) || || Yankee Stadium || 25,816 || 57–41
|- align="center" bgcolor="bbffbb"
| 99 || July 23 || Angels || 5–4 || Nelson (3–5) || Hasegawa (2–5) || || Yankee Stadium || 26,750 || 58–41
|- align="center" bgcolor="bbbbbb"
| – || July 24 || Angels || colspan=5| Postponed (rain); rescheduled for August 20 || ||
|- align="center" bgcolor="ffbbbb"
| 100 || July 25 || Mariners || 1–8 || Moyer (11–3) || Wells (10–5) || || Yankee Stadium || 46,282 || 58–42
|- align="center" bgcolor="ffbbbb"
| 101 || July 26 || Mariners || 7–9 || Ayala (7–4) || Irabu (2–2) || Charlton (14) || Yankee Stadium || 54,664 || 58–43
|- align="center" bgcolor="ffbbbb"
| 102 || July 27 || Mariners || 2–3 || Fassero (9–6) || Pettitte (12–6) || Wells (2) || Yankee Stadium || 49,550 || 58–44
|- align="center" bgcolor="bbffbb"
| 103 || July 28 || Athletics || 4–3 || Rivera (3–3) || Small (7–5) || || Yankee Stadium || 25,570 || 59–44
|- align="center" bgcolor="bbffbb"
| 104 || July 29 || Athletics || 7–4 || Gooden (4–3) || Reyes (3–2) || Rivera (31) || Yankee Stadium || 33,341 || 60–44
|- align="center" bgcolor="bbffbb"
| 105 || July 30 || Athletics || 7–0 || Wells (11–5) || Karsay (3–11) || || Yankee Stadium || 35,480 || 61–44
|-

|- align="center" bgcolor="bbffbb"
| 106 || August 1 || Twins || 8–3 || Pettitte (13–6) || Robertson (7–9) || || Yankee Stadium || 28,042 || 62–44
|- align="center" bgcolor="ffbbbb"
| 107 || August 2 || Twins || 4–5 || Swindell (7–2) || Cone (11–5) || Aguilera (20) || Yankee Stadium || 33,261 || 62–45
|- align="center" bgcolor="bbffbb"
| 108 || August 3 || Twins || 6–5 || Gooden (5–3) || Hawkins (3–7) || Rivera (32) || Yankee Stadium || 36,896 || 63–45
|- align="center" bgcolor="bbffbb"
| 109 || August 4 || @ Royals || 5–4 || Wells (12–5) || Rusch (3–8) || Rivera (33) || Kauffman Stadium || 29,613 || 64–45
|- align="center" bgcolor="bbffbb"
| 110 || August 5 || @ Royals || 4–1 || Rogers (5–4) || Appier (6–10) || || Kauffman Stadium || 21,073 || 65–45
|- align="center" bgcolor="ffbbbb"
| 111 || August 6 || @ Rangers || 2–6 || Oliver (8–10) || Pettitte (13–7) || || The Ballpark in Arlington || 34,067 || 65–46
|- align="center" bgcolor="bbffbb"
| 112 || August 7 || @ Rangers || 4–2 || Cone (12–5) || Witt (10–8) || Rivera (34) || The Ballpark in Arlington || 39,918 || 66–46
|- align="center" bgcolor="ffbbbb"
| 113 || August 8 || @ Twins || 1–9 || Hawkins (4–7) || Gooden (5–4) || || Hubert H. Humphrey Metrodome || 24,201 || 66–47
|- align="center" bgcolor="bbffbb"
| 114 || August 9 || @ Twins || 4–1 || Wells (13–5) || Radke (16–6) || Rivera (35) || Hubert H. Humphrey Metrodome || 42,151 || 67–47
|- align="center" bgcolor="bbffbb"
| 115 || August 10 || @ Twins || 9–6 || Mendoza (4–4) || Miller (0–3) || Rivera (36) || Hubert H. Humphrey Metrodome || 28,580 || 68–47
|- align="center" bgcolor="bbffbb"
| 116 || August 11 || @ Twins || 11–0 || Pettitte (14–7) || Robertson (7–11) || || Hubert H. Humphrey Metrodome || 22,301 || 69–47
|- align="center" bgcolor="ffbbbb"
| 117 || August 12 || Royals || 4–6 || Perez (2–0) || Cone (12–6) || Montgomery (8) || Yankee Stadium || 31,452 || 69–48
|- align="center" bgcolor="bbffbb"
| 118 || August 13 || Royals || 9–3 || Irabu (3–2) || Belcher (11–11) || || Yankee Stadium || 31,418 || 70–48
|- align="center" bgcolor="bbffbb"
| 119 || August 14 || Royals || 10–5 || Wells (14–5) || Olson (1–1) || Rivera (37) || Yankee Stadium || 28,991 || 71–48
|- align="center" bgcolor="bbffbb"
| 120 || August 15 || Rangers || 5–2 || Gooden (6–4) || Clark (1–4) || Rivera (38) || Yankee Stadium || 36,231 || 72–48
|- align="center" bgcolor="ffbbbb"
| 121 || August 16 || Rangers || 5–8 || Wetteland (7–2) || Mendoza (4–5) || || Yankee Stadium || 41,634 || 72–49
|- align="center" bgcolor="bbffbb"
| 122 || August 17 || Rangers || 8–0 || Mendoza (5–5) || Witt (11–9) || || Yankee Stadium || 42,002 || 73–49
|- align="center" bgcolor="ffbbbb"
| 123 || August 19 || @ Angels || 4–12 || Dickson (12–5) || Wells (14–6) || || Anaheim Stadium || 22,596 || 73–50
|- align="center" bgcolor="bbffbb"
| 124 || August 20 || @ Angels || 7–3 || Gooden (7–4) || Hill (6–10) || Mendoza (2) || Anaheim Stadium || N/A || 74–50
|- align="center" bgcolor="bbffbb"
| 125 || August 20 || @ Angels || 8–5 || Irabu (4–2) || Langston (2–4) || Rivera (39) || Anaheim Stadium || 32,343 || 75–50
|- align="center" bgcolor="bbffbb"
| 126 || August 21 || @ Angels || 4–3 (12) || Stanton (6–0) || Harris (2–3) || Nelson (2) || Anaheim Stadium || 27,102 || 76–50
|- align="center" bgcolor="ffbbbb"
| 127 || August 22 || @ Mariners || 5–9 || Fassero (13–7) || Rogers (5–5) || || Kingdome || 57,351 || 76–51
|- align="center" bgcolor="bbffbb"
| 128 || August 23 || @ Mariners || 10–8 || Rivera (4–3) || Slocumb (0–7) || Stanton (2) || Kingdome || 57,282 || 77–51
|- align="center" bgcolor="ffbbbb"
| 129 || August 24 || @ Mariners || 3–5 || Ayala (9–4) || Wells (14–7) || Timlin (10) || Kingdome || 54,391 || 77–52
|- align="center" bgcolor="bbffbb"
| 130 || August 26 || @ Athletics || 18–2 || Pettitte (15–7) || Oquist (2–4) || || Oakland Alameda Coliseum || 14,301 || 78–52 
|- align="center" bgcolor="ffbbbb"
| 131 || August 27 || @ Athletics || 7–8 || Matthews (8–5) || Nelson (3–6) || || Oakland Alameda Coliseum || 18,079 || 78–53
|- align="center" bgcolor="ffbbbb"
| 132 || August 29 || Expos || 3–4 || Telford (4–4) || Rivera (4–4) || Urbina (23) || Yankee Stadium || 33,893 || 78–54
|- align="center" bgcolor="ffbbbb"
| 133 || August 30 || Expos || 2–7 || Martínez (16–6) || Wells (14–8) || || Yankee Stadium || 40,362 || 78–55
|- align="center" bgcolor="bbffbb"
| 134 || August 31 || Expos || 3–2 || Pettitte (16–7) || Johnson (1–3) || Rivera (40) || Yankee Stadium || 55,707 || 79–55
|-

|- align="center" bgcolor="ffbbbb"
| 135 || September 1 || @ Phillies || 1–5 || Schilling (14–10) || Irabu (4–3) || || Veterans Stadium || 50,869 || 79–56
|- align="center" bgcolor="ffbbbb"
| 136 || September 2 || @ Phillies || 0–5 || Grace (2–0) || Rogers (5–6) || || Veterans Stadium || 37,258 || 79–57
|- align="center" bgcolor="ffbbbb"
| 137 || September 3 || @ Phillies || 4–5 || Spradlin (3–6) || Stanton (6–1) || || Veterans Stadium || 38,352 || 79–58
|- align="center" bgcolor="ffbbbb"
| 138 || September 4 || Orioles || 2–5 || Krivda (3–0) || Wells (14–9) || Myers (41) || Yankee Stadium || 39,770 || 79–59
|- align="center" bgcolor="ffbbbb"
| 139 || September 5 || Orioles || 9–13 || Key (15–8) || Irabu (4–4) || || Yankee Stadium || 46,568 || 79–60
|- align="center" bgcolor="ffbbbb"
| 140 || September 6 || Orioles || 1–4 || Erickson (16–5) || Mendoza (5–6) || || Yankee Stadium || 52,535 || 79–61
|- align="center" bgcolor="bbffbb"
| 141 || September 7 || Orioles || 10–3 || Rogers (6–6) || Mussina (13–7) || || Yankee Stadium || 47,945 || 80–61
|- align="center" bgcolor="bbffbb"
| 142 || September 9 || @ Red Sox || 8–6 || Banks (1–0) || Lowe (2–5) || Rivera (41) || Fenway Park || 32,355 || 81–61
|- align="center" bgcolor="ffbbbb"
| 143 || September 10 || @ Red Sox || 2–5 || Sele (13–12) || Wells (14–10) || Gordon (5) || Fenway Park || 31,011 || 81–62
|- align="center" bgcolor="bbffbb"
| 144 || September 11 || @ Orioles || 14–2 || Pettitte (17–7) || Key (15–9) || || Oriole Park at Camden Yards || 47,066 || 82–62
|- align="center" bgcolor="bbffbb"
| 145 || September 12 || @ Orioles || 13–5 || Mendoza (6–6) || Erickson (16–6) || || Oriole Park at Camden Yards || 47,511 || 83–62
|- align="center" bgcolor="ffbbbb"
| 146 || September 13 || @ Orioles || 1–6 || Mussina (14–7) || Rogers (6–7) || || Oriole Park at Camden Yards || 47,696 || 83–63
|- align="center" bgcolor="bbffbb"
| 147 || September 14 || @ Orioles || 8–2 || Gooden (8–4) || Kamieniecki (9–6) || || Oriole Park at Camden Yards || 47,264 || 84–63
|- align="center" bgcolor="bbffbb"
| 148 || September 15 || Red Sox || 7–6 || Rivera (5–4) || Corsi (3–2) || || Yankee Stadium || 25,873 || 85–63
|- align="center" bgcolor="bbffbb"
| 149 || September 16 || Red Sox || 2–0 || Pettitte (18–7) || Wasdin (4–6) || Rivera (42) || Yankee Stadium || || 86–63
|- align="center" bgcolor="bbffbb"
| 150 || September 16 || Red Sox || 4–3 || Banks (2–0) || Checo (0–1) || Rivera (43) || Yankee Stadium || 29,145 || 87–63
|- align="center" bgcolor="bbffbb"
| 151 || September 17 || Tigers || 6–2 || Mendoza (7–6) || Moehler (11–11) || || Yankee Stadium || 19,331 || 88–63
|- align="center" bgcolor="ffbbbb"
| 152 || September 18 || Tigers || 7–9 || Jones (4–3) || Borowski (2–3) || Miceli (3) || Yankee Stadium || 18,600 || 88–64
|- align="center" bgcolor="ffbbbb"
| 153 || September 19 || Blue Jays || 0–3 || Daal (2–2) || Gooden (8–5) || Escobar (13) || Yankee Stadium || 31,195 || 88–65
|- align="center" bgcolor="bbffbb"
| 154 || September 20 || Blue Jays || 4–3 || Banks (3–0) || Janzen (1–1) || || Yankee Stadium || 38,332 || 89–65
|- align="center" bgcolor="bbffbb"
| 155 || September 21 || Blue Jays || 5–4 || Boehringer (3–2) || Almanzar (0–1) || || Yankee Stadium || 40,038 || 90–65
|- align="center" bgcolor="bbffbb"
| 156 || September 22 || Blue Jays || 8–1 || Wells (15–10) || Hentgen (15–10) || || Yankee Stadium || 23,380 || 91–65
|- align="center" bgcolor="ffbbbb"
| 157 || September 23 || @ Indians || 9–10 || Mesa (4–4) || Nelson (3–7) || || Jacobs Field || 43,039 || 91–66
|- align="center" bgcolor="bbffbb"
| 158 || September 24 || @ Indians || 8–4 || Gooden (9–5) || Anderson (4–2) || || Jacobs Field || 42,976 || 92–66
|- align="center" bgcolor="bbffbb"
| 159 || September 25 || @ Indians || 5–4 || Mendoza (8–6) || Shuey (4–2) || Stanton (3) || Jacobs Field || 43,004 || 93–66
|- align="center" bgcolor="bbffbb"
| 160 || September 26 || @ Tigers || 8–2 || Rivera (6–4) || Jones (5–4) || || Tiger Stadium || 29,206 || 94–66
|- align="center" bgcolor="bbffbb"
| 161 || September 27 || @ Tigers || 6–1 || Wells (16–10) || Moehler (11–12) || || Tiger Stadium || 33,712 || 95–66
|- align="center" bgcolor="bbffbb"
| 162 || September 28 || @ Tigers || 7–2 || Irabu (5–4) || Keagle (3–5) || || Tiger Stadium || 38,171 || 96–66
|-

Postseason Game log

|- align="center" bgcolor="bbffbb"
| 1 || September 30 || Indians || 8–6 || Mendoza (1–0) || Plunk (0–1) || Rivera (1) || Yankee Stadium || 57,398 || 1–0
|- align="center" bgcolor="ffbbbb"
| 2 || October 2 || Indians || 5–7 || Wright (1–0) || Pettitte (0–1) || || Yankee Stadium || 57,360 || 1–1
|- align="center" bgcolor="bbffbb"
| 3 || October 4 || @ Indians || 6–1 || Wells (1–0) || Nagy (0–1) || || Jacobs Field || 45,274 || 2–1
|- align="center" bgcolor="ffbbbb"
| 4 || October 5 || @ Indians || 2–3 || Jackson (1–0) || Mendoza (1–1) || || Jacobs Field || 45,231 || 2–2
|- align="center" bgcolor="ffbbbb"
| 5 || October 6 || @ Indians || 3–4 || Wright (2–0) || Pettitte (0–2) || Mesa (1) || Jacobs Field || 45,203 || 2–3
|-

Player stats

Batting
Note: Pos = Position; G = Games played; AB = At bats; H = Hits; Avg. = Batting average; HR = Home runs; RBI = Runs batted in

Other batters
Note: G = Games played; AB = At bats; H = Hits; Avg. = Batting average; HR = Home runs; RBI = Runs batted in

Starting pitchers
Note: G = Games pitched; IP = Innings pitched; W = Wins; L = Losses; ERA = Earned run average; SO = Strikeouts

Other pitchers
Note: G = Games pitched; IP = Innings pitched; W = Wins; L = Losses; ERA = Earned run average; SO = Strikeouts

Relief pitchers
Note: G = Games pitched; W = Wins; L = Losses; SV = Saves; ERA = Earned run average; SO = Strikeouts

ALDS

Game 1
September 30, Yankee Stadium

Game 2
October 2, Yankee Stadium

Game 3
October 4, Jacobs Field

Game 4
October 5, Jacobs Field

Game 5
October 6, Jacobs Field

Awards and records

 Tino Martinez, Silver Slugger Award

Farm system

References

External links
1997 New York Yankees at Baseball Reference
1997 New York Yankees at Baseball Almanac

New York Yankees seasons
New York Yankees
New York Yankees
1990s in the Bronx